WOSN (97.1 MHz) is a commercial FM radio station owned by Treasure & Space Coast Radio. It broadcasts a soft adult contemporary radio format, switching to Christmas music for part of November and December. Licensed to Indian River Shores, Florida, the station serves the Treasure Coast including Vero Beach and Fort Pierce.  The station license is held by Vero Beach Broadcasters.  

The studios and offices are on 16th Street in Vero Beach.  The transmitter is off 77th Street, also in Vero Beach.  It has an effective radiated power (ERP) of 23,000 watts.

History
In 1996, the station signed on the air as WAAE.  It was owned by Centennial Broadcasting of Florida with studios on 43rd Street in Vero Beach.  Within months, it had switched its call sign to WOSN, representing the word "Ocean."  The station originally had an adult standards sound.  WOSN derived some of its programming from Westwood One's America's Best Music satellite service.

Jeff Rollins, who had been with America's Best Music, hosted a local morning show from 6 a.m. to noon.  Weekend programming included Herb Oscar Anderson, formerly of WABC in New York City, Saturdays at 7 p.m.

In early 2017, WOSN updated its sound to soft adult contemporary music.  Current on-air personalities include Hamp Elliott, Bob Soos, Jim Davis, Rick Lane, Juan O'Reilly, and Bill Dake (host of the Sunday Smooth Jazz Brunch).

References

External links

OSN
Radio stations established in 1996
Mainstream adult contemporary radio stations in the United States
Soft adult contemporary radio stations in the United States
1996 establishments in Florida